Huỳnh Kim Chi, also known by the stage name Hoàng Oanh (born 6 November 1946), is a Vietnamese singer. Born in Mỹ Tho, she was popular during the 1970s before the Fall of Saigon, then emigrated to the United States. She is still popular among Vietnamese overseas as a singer of traditional music.

References

20th-century Vietnamese women singers
 1946 births
 Living people
 People from Mỹ Tho
 Vietnamese emigrants to the United States